Toto XIV is the thirteenth studio album by the American rock band Toto (though the band's fourteenth album overall, when one counts either Toto XX or the Dune soundtrack). Toto released the album on March 20, 2015. It is the band's first studio album since Falling in Between in 2006.

The album marks the return of Joseph Williams on lead vocals and Steve Porcaro on keyboards and vocals, as well as the only album marking the return of its original bassist David Hungate (since Toto IV in 1982) before he left the band in September and the only album with drummer Keith Carlock. It is also the first studio album since 1982's Toto IV not to feature longtime bassist Mike Porcaro, who had been inactive since 2007 due to ALS and died shortly before the album's release.

Background
Their final contractual obligation with Frontier Records, Toto made the record understanding that it likely would not make pop radio. With the return of Steve Porcaro and David Hungate, David Paich found the sessions to be "very cyclical", which was further helped by the location of their studio: it was located just a half mile away from where they recorded their eponymous debut. One song, "Chinatown", was actually written for the first album, but never fully developed until the Toto XIV recording sessions. The name was explained by band member Steve Lukather in December 2014: The band counted all the albums with new released music. Because of this, the album Toto XX from 1998, although not a studio album, but a collection of older unreleased songs, was counted as well, making Toto XIV the 14th album.

Reception

AllMusic's review XIV described the album's title as a reference to their platinum-selling 1982 album Toto IV, but said that it "doesn't share much with that Yacht Rock classic. Despite the McCartney-esque shimmer of "The Little Things" (not to mention the passing allusions to "99" on "Chinatown"), tunes take a backseat to bombast on Toto XIV, with this Steve Lukather-led incarnation accentuating intricate instrumental interplay." The review also described a "furious first half, containing such plainly evident socio-political protests as "Holy War," "Running Out of Time," "Unknown Soldier," and "21st Century Blues"". It concludes that the band is "not living in the past, nor are they denying it: they're accepting all their indulgences, all the intricacies that come with their virtuosity, and making a record that reflects what these veteran rockers have seen and learned in their 40 years in the business."

Track listing

Personnel
Credits taken from album’s liner notes.

Toto
Steve Lukather –  guitars , lead vocals , background vocals , bass guitar 
Joseph Williams – lead vocals , background vocals , keyboards , hand drumming on leather bench , additional keyboards 
David Paich –  piano , keyboards , organ , lead vocals , background vocals , upright bass 
Steve Porcaro – synthesizers , keyboards , lead vocals , samples 
Keith Carlock – drums , background vocals 

Additional musicians
David Hungate – bass guitar 
Tal Wilkenfeld – bass guitar 
Leland Sklar – bass guitar 
Tim Lefebvre – bass guitar 
Lenny Castro – percussion 
Martin Tillman – cello 
CJ Vanston – additional synthesizers , additional keyboards , synthesizers , background vocals , end vamp piano 
Michael McDonald – background vocals 
Amy Keys – background vocals 
Mabvuto Carpenter – background vocals 
Jamie Savko – background vocals 
Emma Williams – background vocals 
Tom Scott – saxophones , horn arrangement 

Technical personnel:
Produced by: CJ Vanston, David Paich, Steve Lukather, Joseph Williams (except for tracks 7 & 12, produced by Steve Porcaro and CJ Vaston)
Engineered by: CJ Vanston, Csaba Petrocz, Joseph Williams, Stefan Nordin
Assistant engineers: Steve Genewick, Chandler Harod: 
Mixed by: CJ Vanston at The Treehouse, North Hollywood, CA
Mastered by: Peter Doell at Universal Mastering, Los Angeles, CA

Other:

Photography: Heather Porcaro
Art Direction: Thunderwing
Cover Art: Fred Kim
Production Management: JoAnn Tominaga
Business Management: Ron Remis and Trish Field
Legal Affairs: Gary Gilbert at Manatt, Phelps & Phillips, LLP
Public Relations: Steve Karas and Keith Hagen

Charts

Weekly charts

Year-end charts

The single "Burn" reached as high as number 7 on the World Modern Rock Top 30 Singles Chart, where it appeared for 20 consecutive weeks.

References

External links
 CJ Vanston strikes again: There's a thirst for real music Interview - By Arend, Jun 3, 2015 7:11 AM

Toto (band) albums
2015 albums
Frontiers Records albums
Albums recorded at Capitol Studios
Blues rock albums by American artists
Hard rock albums by American artists
Progressive rock albums by American artists